"Love Will Save the Day" is a song recorded by American singer Whitney Houston from her second multi-platinum studio album Whitney (1987). The song was released on July 5, 1988 by Arista Records as the album's fifth single. The song did not have a music video but still was successful, climbing into the US Top Ten. "Love Will Save the Day" is the fastest-tempoed song on the album Whitney. Written by Toni C, produced by John "Jellybean" Benitez, it is one of the uptempo singles on the album that also included "I Wanna Dance with Somebody (Who Loves Me)" and "So Emotional."

Critical reception
Los Angeles Times editor Robert Hilburn described the song as a "hollow dance track that tries to mix social comment with dance-floor vigor." Rolling Stone's Vince Alleti wrote: "Jellybean clicks neatly with "Love Will Save the Day," the only song to even remotely acknowledge the problems of the world at large and the most vivaciously percussive track on the record." Whitney fanpage described this song as Latin influenced, sparkling song. St. Petersburg Times editors Eric Snider and Annelise Wamsley described Love Will Save the Day: "a unique tune on an extremely mainstream album. Its lively Afro-Cuban flavor, driven by a wall of clattering percussion, is truly joyous."

Chart performance
At this time, Whitney Houston had achieved a record-breaking string of seven consecutive number-one hits, with four of those #1's from her current album "Whitney". "Love Will Save the Day" did not become Houston's eighth consecutive number one, but continued her trend of hit singles by peaking in the US Top 10. The song also made the Top 10 without an accompanying music video.

The song remained in the Top 40 for 11 weeks, and reached #5 on the US R&B Chart, and #1 on the Hot Club/Dance Play Tracks. On the Radio & Records Airplay chart the song debuted at #33 on the July 7, 1988 issue, after five weeks it reached and peaked at #7 staying there for two weeks and staying on the top 10 of the chart for four weeks, the single remained on the chart for ten weeks.

In the Netherlands, it reached number 6, #10 in the United Kingdom, and the Top 20 in Switzerland.

After her death in 2012, Entertainment Weekly would rank the song #20 on its list Whitney Houston: Her 25 Best Songs and stated: "the Miami bass and spicy horns on this high-BPM (beats per minute) dance-pop workout pointed to Houston's willingness to experiment and evolve."

Track listings and formats

US 7-inch Vinyl AS 1-9720
A1: "Love Will Save the Day" – 4:19
B1: "How Will I Know" (edited remix) – 4:45
US CD maxi-single promo ASCD-9721
"Love Will Save the Day" (single version) – 4:22
"Love Will Save the Day" (extended remix) – 7:59
"Dub Will Save the Day" – 4:59
"Love Will Save the Day" (a cappella) – 5:18
Europe CD maxi-single 661 516
"Love Will Save the Day" (extended club mix) – 7:59
"Love Will Save the Day" (single version) – 4:22
"Hold Me" – 6:01
UK 12-inch Vinyl 611 516
A1: "Love Will Save the Day" (extended remix) – 6:55
B1: "Hold Me" (duet) – 6:00
Canada 12-inch Vinyl AD1-9721
A1: "Love Will Save the Day" (extended remix) – 7:58
A2: "Love Will Save the Day" (a cappella) – 5:14
B1: "Love Will Save the Day" (single version) – 3:50
B2: "Dub Will Save the Day" – 4:58
Germany 12-inch Vinyl 611 516
A1: "Love Will Save the Day" (extended remix) – 6:55
B1: "Hold Me" (Duet) – 6:00
Australia and New Zealand 12-inch Vinyl TDS 466
A1: "Love Will Save the Day" (extended remix) – 7:58
A2: "Love Will Save the Day" (a cappella) – 5:14
B1: "Love Will Save the Day" (single version) – 3:50
B2: "Dub Will Save the Day" – 4:58
Spain 12-inch Vinyl 611 516
A1: "Love Will Save the Day" (extended remix) – 6:55
B1: "Hold Me" (Duet) – 6:00

Versions

Extended Remix – 7:58
Extended Remix Edit – 6:55
7" Version – 4:22
12" Version – 5:21
12" Version (Instrumental) – 5:21 (not released)
Acappella – 5:14
Dub Will Save the Day – 4:58
Jellybean Remix – 7:28
The Underground Mix – 7:30
The Underground Edit – 5:40
Dub – 6:00
Instrumental Dub – 6:00

Personnel

Executive producer – Clive Davis
Produced by John "Jellybean" Benitez
Arranged by Jack Waldman and Toni C.
Vocals arranged by Whitney Houston
Engineered by Doc Dougherty and Michael Hutchinson
Additional engineering by Dennis McKay
Mix engineer by Michael Hutchinson
Written by Toni C.
Jellybean – drum programming
Linden Aaron – Simmons toms
Jack Waldman, Fred Zarr – synths
Paul Jackson, Jr. – guitar
Roy Ayers – vibes
Paulinho da Costa, Bashiri Johnson, Sammy Figueroa – percussion
Background vocals – Whitney Houston

Charts

Weekly charts

Year-end charts

See also
List of number-one dance singles of 1988 (U.S.)

References

External links
Love Will Save the Day at Discogs

1987 songs
1988 singles
Dance music songs
Whitney Houston songs
Arista Records singles